"Bouge de là" (French, meaning: "move from there" or "get out of here", also translated as "take a hike") is a song by MC Solaar. It samples ‘The Message’ by ‘Cymande’, a band formed in London in the early 1970s. This was the first single from his album Qui sème le vent récolte le tempo, and reached #22 on French SNEP Singles Chart in September 1991. It was also the second hip hop hit in France, after Benny B's "Vous êtes fous!" in 1990, although it was considered by the French newspaper Le Figaro as the first one. The instrumental was used by US rapper Masta Ace in "Me & The Biz".

The song was covered by Les Enfoirés on their album 2011: Dans l'œil des Enfoirés, and included in the medley "Une nuit au musée". The song was performed by Grégoire, Alizée, Jean-Louis Aubert, Zazie, Renan Luce, Hélène Ségara, Claire Keim, Tina Arena, Christophe Maé and Gérard Jugnot.

Formats and track listings

Personnel

 Bass: Laurent Verneray
 Chorus: Melaaz 
 Keyboards: Jean-François Delfour
 Mixed by Etienne De Crecy
 Producer, scratches: Jimmy Jay
 Recorded by Philippe "Zsdar" Cerboneschi
 Recorded and mixed at Studio Plus Trente

Charts

References

1991 debut singles
MC Solaar songs
1991 songs